Rick Hoogendorp (born 12 January 1975) is a former Dutch football striker.

Career 
Hoogendorp was born in Blerick, Limburg. He played for MVV Maastricht (1995–1997), FC Dordrecht (1997–1999), RKC Waalwijk (1999–2006), VfL Wolfsburg (2006), and ADO Den Haag (2007–2009) in the Dutch highest league, Eredivisie. He also had a short spell at Celta de Vigo in Spain.

Managerial career
In the summer 2009, Hoogendorp was hired as a relationship manager for ADO Den Haag. He began his coaching career at the end of August 2011, also at ADO, where he was going to function as a forward coach for the club's academy teams. From the summer 2014, he took charge of ADO's U-18 squad.

From 2015 to 2017, he was in charge of the U15's. Beside that, Hoogendorp also functioned as assistant coach for Jong ADO Den Haag from June 2017. From the summer 2018, he was promoted to U17 manager along with his position on the Jong team.

In May 2020 it was confirmed, that Hoogendorp from the 2020–21 season would continue as a first team assistant coach under head coach Aleksandar Ranković. However, Hoogendorp was removed from this position on 4 November 2020 and returned to work with the club's academy. He was appointed in a role as forward coach for the academy teams and assistant coach for Jong ADO Den Haag.

References

External links
 Profile 

Living people
1975 births
Footballers from Venlo
Association football forwards
Dutch footballers
Dutch expatriate sportspeople in Spain
Dutch expatriate sportspeople in Germany
ADO Den Haag players
MVV Maastricht players
FC Dordrecht players
RKC Waalwijk players
RC Celta de Vigo players
VfL Wolfsburg players
SVV Scheveningen players
Eredivisie players
La Liga players
Bundesliga players
Expatriate footballers in Spain
Expatriate footballers in Germany